Josefina Gómez Mendoza (born 1 June 1942) is a Spanish geographer, writer, and professor emerita. From 2001 to 2005, she was Rector of the National University of Distance Education (UNED). She is a member of the Royal Academy of History, Medal No. 7 (elected 8 February 2002, took office 27 April 2003), and the Royal Academy of Engineering, Medal No. 58 (took office 21 March 2006).

Career
Josefina Gómez Mendoza holds a licentiate in Philosophy and Literature from History Department at the Complutense University of Madrid (1974), as well as a Doctorate in Philosophy and Literature from the same university's History and Geography Department.

In 1978, she was assistant professor of geography by examination, and in 1979 she was an associate professor. In 1981 she won the access competition for the Geography Chair of Spain.

From 1985 to 2012, she was Professor of Regional Geographical Analysis at the Autonomous University of Madrid.

In June 2005, she was named Doctor Honoris Causa of the Charles III University of Madrid and invested on 3 February 2006.

In September 2012, she was appointed Chair Emerita at the Autonomous University of Madrid. That October she was also named Professor Emerita of the Autonomous University, and that November she was named Doctor Honoris Causa by the École normale supérieure de Lyon.

Gómez Mendoza was an elective State Councilor from 2003 to 2008 and from 2008 to 2013. She has been a Member of the National Council of National Parks since 2008.

She was President of the Association of Spanish Geographers from 1993 to 1997.

In addition to publishing several books, she has written for some media outlets, including the newspaper El País.

Books
 1977, Agricultura y expansión urbana: la campiña del bajo Henares en la aglomeración de Madrid, 
 1982, El pensamiento geográfico: estudio interpretativo y antología de textos
 1982, Viajeros y paisajes
 1992, Ciencia y política de los montes españoles (1848–1936)
 1999, Los paisajes de Madrid (Naturaleza y Medio Rural),

Awards and honors
 1998: Gold Medal of the Autonomous University of Madrid
 2002: Grand Cross of the Civil Order of Alfonso X, the Wise
 2005: Doctor Honoris Causa of the Charles III University of Madrid
 2009: 
 2011: Fernando González Bernáldez Distinction from the González Bernáldez Foundation
 2012: Doctor Honoris Causa of the École normale supérieure de Lyon
 Diego de Saavedra Fajardo Award for Geography, Economics, Sociology, and Literature
 Ordre des Palmes Académiques

References

External links
 

1942 births
20th-century Spanish historians
20th-century Spanish women writers
21st-century Spanish women writers
Academic staff of the Autonomous University of Madrid
Living people
Members of the Real Academia de la Historia
Recipients of the Civil Order of Alfonso X, the Wise
Rectors of universities in Spain
Spanish academic administrators
Spanish geographers
Spanish women academics
Women geographers
Writers from Madrid
Women heads of universities and colleges
Spanish women historians